Ebrahimabad (also Romanized as Ebrāhīmābād) is a village in Sharifabad Rural District, Sharifabad District, Pakdasht County, Tehran Province, Iran. At the 2006 census, its population was 1,725, in 436 families.

References 

Populated places in Pakdasht County